The Green Emperor is a 1939 German crime film directed by Paul Mundorf and starring Gustav Diessl, Carola Höhn and René Deltgen.  It was inspired by the real-life case of a Belgian financier who had gone missing during a flight across the English Channel.

The film's sets were designed by the art director Erich Kettelhut. Location shooting took place in the countryside outside Berlin during 1938. It premiered in Vienna in February 1939.

Synopsis
A shady British businessmen frames his pilot for his murder. After being released from prison, the pilot attempts to track down his former employer who is still alive.

Cast
 Gustav Diessl as Henry Miller / Hendrik Mylius
 Carola Höhn as Joana Martinez
 René Deltgen as Jan Karsten
 Ellen Bang as Eva Latour
 Aribert Wäscher as Bankier Vandermer
 Hilde Hildebrand as Nora
 Paul Westermeier as Hoyens
 Alexander Engel as Sekretär Favard
 Albert Hörrmann as Marcel Carraux
 Hans Leibelt as Picard
 Hans Halder as Bankiert Jaquine
 Otto Matthies as Agent van't Hoff
 Eduard von Winterstein as Gerichtsvorsitzender im 2. Prozeß
 Edwin Jürgensen as Prosecutor in the first trial
 Franz Schafheitlin as Prosecutor in the second trial
 Erwin Biegel as Diener Pieter auf der Fazenda
 Ilse Trautschold as Hoysens Sekretärin
 Ingolf Kuntze as Gerichtsvorsitzender im 1. Prozeß
 Siegfried Schürenberg as Defense lawyer
 Bruno Hübner as Geschworener
 Aribert Grimmer as Geschworener
 Walther Süssenguth as Geschworener
 Eric Helgar as Singender Arbeiter auf der Fazenda
 Erich Fiedler as Reporter

References

Bibliography

External links 
 

1939 films
1939 crime films
German crime films
Films of Nazi Germany
1930s German-language films
Films set in South America
Films set in London
UFA GmbH films
German black-and-white films
1930s German films